Nikolskoye Urban Settlement is the name of several municipal formations in Leningrad Oblast, Russia.

Nikolskoye Urban Settlement, a municipal formation corresponding to Nikolskoye Settlement Municipal Formation, an administrative division of Tosnensky District
Nikolskoye Urban Settlement, a municipal formation corresponding to Nikolskoye Settlement Municipal Formation, an administrative division of Podporozhsky District

See also
Nikolsky (disambiguation)

References

Notes

Sources

